Anthene xanthopoecilus is a butterfly in the family Lycaenidae. It is found in Gabon, the Republic of the Congo, and the Democratic Republic of the Congo (Uele, Ituri, North Kivu, Sankuru and Lualaba).

References

Butterflies described in 1893
Anthene
Butterflies of Africa